was a Japanese track and field athlete. He competed in the men's shot put at the 1936 Summer Olympics. He later made a name for himself as a photographer.

References

1909 births
1963 deaths
Place of birth missing
Japanese male shot putters
Olympic male shot putters
Olympic athletes of Japan
Athletes (track and field) at the 1936 Summer Olympics
Japanese photographers